The Irish Sword is the official journal of the Military History Society of Ireland containing articles on the military history of Ireland, book reviews, notes, notices, queries, illustrations and proceedings.

It includes information on subjects such as "West Cork and the Elizabethan wars" and the experiences of Irish soldiers in Swedish service.

The journal has been published since 1949, normally with two issues a year. The editor-in-chief is Kenneth Ferguson. Gerard Anthony Hayes-McCoy was founder editor, editing the journal for the first ten years to 1959. Kevin Danaher edited from 1960 to 1971.

References

External links
 
 The Military History Society of Ireland

Publications established in 1949
Military history of Ireland
Biannual journals
Military journals
English-language journals
Academic journals published by learned and professional societies